Minister for Racing and Gaming is a position in the government of Western Australia, currently held by Paul Papalia of the Labor Party. The position was first created in 1984, in the ministry of Brian Burke, and has existed in every government since then. The minister is responsible for the Department of Racing, Gaming and Liquor, which oversees gambling, liquor licenses, and racing in Western Australia.

Titles
 20 December 1984 – present: Minister for Racing and Gaming

List of ministers

See also
 Minister for Sport and Recreation (Western Australia)
 Minister for Tourism (Western Australia)

References
 David Black (2014), The Western Australian Parliamentary Handbook (Twenty-Third Edition). Perth [W.A.]: Parliament of Western Australia.

Racing and Gaming
Minister for Racing and Gaming